Tamiko Butler (born 4 January 1991) is a triathlete and former road cyclist from Antigua and Barbuda. She became Antigua and Barbuda national road champion in 2009, 2010, 2012 and 2014. She represented her nation at the 2011 Pan American Games in the road race and time trial and at the 2014 Commonwealth Games in the road race, individual pursuit, points race and scratch race. She also competed at the 2015 Pan American Games. She was named as Antigua and Barbuda's sportswoman of the year in 2011.

Major results
Source: 

2009 
 National Road Championships
1st  Time trial
1st  Road race
2010
 1st  Time trial, National Road Championships
2011
 1st  Time trial, Caribbean Road Championships
 National Road Championships
1st  Time trial
1st  Road race
2012
 Caribbean Road Championships
1st  Road race
3rd  Time trial
 National Road Championships
1st  Time trial
1st  Road race
2013
 Caribbean Road Championships
1st  Road race
2nd  Time trial
 1st  Road race, National Road Championships
2014
 1st  Time trial, National Road Championships
2015
 1st  Road race, National Road Championships
2016
 National Road Championships
1st  Time trial
1st  Road race

References

External links
 
 

Antigua and Barbuda female cyclists
Female triathletes
Living people
1991 births
People from St. John's, Antigua and Barbuda
Cyclists at the 2011 Pan American Games
Cyclists at the 2014 Commonwealth Games
Cyclists at the 2015 Pan American Games
Commonwealth Games competitors for Antigua and Barbuda
Pan American Games competitors for Antigua and Barbuda